Donnalucata is a southern Italian fishing village and hamlet (frazione) of Scicli, a municipality in the Province of Ragusa, Sicily. In 2011 it had a population of 3,172.

History
The area has been inhabited since Greek and Phoenician times. during the Roman era it was called Cymbe.

Etymology
Donnalucata stems from the Arabic Ayn al-Awqat, which means the "fountain of the hours." The name stems from the discovery by an Arab man of a spring in Donnalucata that only flowed five times a day at the same time as the Muslim prayers.

Geography
The village is located by the Mediterranean Coast, between Playa Grande (3 km west), Cava d'Aliga (8 km east) and Scicli (9 km south). It is 11 km from Marina di Ragusa, 12 from Sampieri, 18 from Modica and 30 from Ragusa.

Economy
The village has a small fishing port and sandy beaches on either side of the harbour. The local economy is based on fishing, intensive agriculture in greenhouses and during the summer season, tourism.

References

External links

 Donnalucata website (photos)

Frazioni of the Province of Ragusa
Scicli